The discography of Haloo Helsinki!, a Finnish pop rock band, consists of seven studio albums, one live album, one compilation album, one extended play, 13 singles and three promotional singles. According to Musiikkituottajat, Haloo Helsinki! have sold over 73,000 certified records in Finland.

Albums

Studio albums

Live albums

Compilation albums

Extended plays

Singles

Promotional singles

Other charted songs

References

Discographies of Finnish artists
Discography
Pop music group discographies
Rock music group discographies